The canton of Ambérieu-en-Bugey is an administrative division of the Ain department, eastern France. Its borders were modified at the French canton reorganisation which came into effect in March 2015. Its seat is located in Ambérieu-en-Bugey.

Political representation

Department councillors since 2015

Composition

Composition prior to 2015 
The canton of Ambérieu-en-Bugey consisted of 8 communes with a population of 22,151 in 2010.

Composition since 2015 
The new canton consists of 18 communes in their entirety:

Pictures of the canton

See also 
 Cantons of the Ain department
 Communes of France

References 

Cantons of Ain